A bubble column reactor is an apparatus used to generate and control gas-liquid chemical reactions. It consists of a vertically-arranged cylindrical column filled with liquid, at the bottom of which gas is inserted.

Principle 
The introduction of gas takes place at the bottom of the column and causes a turbulent stream to enable an optimum gas exchange. Numerous forms of construction exist. The mixing is done by the gas sparging and it requires less energy than mechanical stirring. The liquid can be in parallel flow or counter-current.

Bubble column reactors are characterized by a high liquid content and a moderate phase boundary surface. The bubble column is particularly useful in reactions where the gas-liquid reaction is slow in relation to the absorption rate. This is the case for gas-liquid reactions with a Hatta number Ha <0.3.

Bubble column reactors are used in various types of chemical reactions like wet oxidation, or as algae bioreactor. Since the computerized design of bubble columns is restricted to a few partial processes, experience in the choice of a particular type column still plays an important role.

Literature 
Bubble column reactors belong to the general class of multiphase reactors which consist of three main categories namely, the trickle bed reactor (fixed or packed bed), fluidized bed reactor, and the bubble column reactor. Bubble columns are the devices in which gas, in the form of bubbles, come in contact with the liquid. The purpose may be simply to mix the two phases or substances are transferred from one phase to another i.e. when the gaseous reactants are dissolved in liquid or when liquid reactant products are stripped. The bubble column in which the gas is fed into the column at the bottom and rises in the liquid escaping from it at the upper surface; the gas is consumed to a greater or lesser extent depending on the intensity of mass transfer and chemical reaction.

BCRs are becoming more competitive due to their inherent advantages and are used in numerous industrial applications. The advantages are; better temperature control; lower pressure drop; and excellent heat transfer rates per unit volume of the reactor. Additional advantages include; higher values of effective interfacial areas; little maintenance required due to simple construction; and relatively cheap to construct and operate and require less floor space. The hydrodynamics of any SBCR have a significant effect on its scale up analysis. In SBCRs, gas phase that is moving upward transfers momentum to the slurry phase that is either stagnant or moving slower than the gas. Therefore, the hydrodynamics of SBCRs are controlled mainly by the gas flow. It has been reported that the operating conditions and design as well as the geometry of the column strongly affect the hydrodynamics of the SBCRs.

References

Sources

External links 
 Modeling of mass transfer characteristics of bubble column reactor with surfactant present

Chemical reactors